Live at 9:30 is the third live album by Baltimore-based band Animal Collective. It was released in 2015 on Domino. The album is a recording of the band's performance at the 9:30 Club in Washington, D.C. on June 12, 2013. All the songs performed appear on the band's previously released LPs and EPs. The show's opening act was fellow Baltimore musician Dan Deacon, who does not appear on the recording.

Track listing

References 

Animal Collective albums
2015 live albums
Domino Recording Company live albums